The northernmost point of land on Earth is a contentious issue due to variation of definition. How permanent some of the contenders are makes hard determination difficult, but sets an important threshold. Problematic issues include ice sheets, water movements and inundation, storm activity that may build, shift, or destroy banks of moraine material, and observational difficulties due to remoteness.

The following table sets out the main contenders for this title.

Currently, Kaffeklubben Island is the northernmost, undisputed candidate among the land areas considered permanent that remain above water.

See also
Extremes on Earth

References

Extreme points of Earth